Hugh D. Auchincloss, Jr. (1897 – 1976) was an American merchant and businessman who was the step-father of First Lady Jackie Bouvier Kennedy.

Hugh Auchincloss may also refer to:

 Hugh Auchincloss (immunologist) (born 1949), American immunologist 
 Hugh D. Auchincloss (merchant) (1858–1913), American merchant and businessman

See also
Hugh Auchincloss Brown (1879–1975), electrical engineer
Hugh Auchincloss Steers (1962–1995), American painter